George Sheffer was a member of the Wisconsin State Assembly during the 1897 session. Sheffer represented Lafayette County, Wisconsin. He was a Republican.

References

People from Lafayette County, Wisconsin
Republican Party members of the Wisconsin State Assembly
Year of birth missing
Year of death missing